Punicacortein may refer to:

 Punicacortein A, an ellagitannin found in pomegranate
 Punicacortein B, an ellagitannin found in pomegranate
 Punicacortein C, an ellagitannin found in pomegranate
 Punicacortein D, an ellagitannin found in pomegranate